Banasiak is a gender-neutral Polish surname that may refer to
Adam Banasiak (born 1989), Polish football player
Aleksandra Banasiak (born 1935), Polish nurse
Aude Banasiak (born 1975), French football midfielder
Justyna Banasiak (born 1986), Polish group rhythmic gymnast
Mark Banasiak, Australian politician
Piotr Banasiak (born 1987), Polish football player

Polish-language surnames